Dayanidhi or Dhayanidhi is an Indian name that may refer to
Given name
Dayanidhi Azhagiri, Indian Tamil cinema producer and distributor
Dayanidhi Maran (born 1966), Indian politician
Dayanidhi Paramahansa Dev (1905–1992), Indian sadguru, yogi, mystic and a Hindu spiritual leader
Surname
Santhosh Dhayanidhi, Indian film composer and singer

Indian masculine given names